U.S. Trentels XIII are a French Rugby league club based in Trentels, Lot-et-Garonne in the Aquitaine region. The club plays in the French National Division 1. Their home ground is the Stade de Lustrac.

History 

Founded as Union Sportive Trentels XIII the club can count on only a brief spell during the 1980s as a successful period. In season 83/84 they reached and won the Federal Division now called the National Division 2 in the final they beat Paris XIII 15-10 thus earning promotion. Three years later they lifted the National 2 title, nowadays known as the National Division 1, when they beat RC Baho XIII in the final 7-6. In season 2011/12 the club reached the National Division 2 final losing to Le Soler XIII 12-23 but despite losing they were also promoted alongside their victors to the 3rd tier. The club still plays at the 3rd tier National Division 1 level

Club honours 

 National Division 1 (National 2) (1): 1986-87
 National Division 2 (Fédéral Division) (1): 1983-84

See also

National Division 1

References

French rugby league teams